The 1974 African Cup of Nations was the ninth edition of the Africa Cup of Nations, the soccer championship of Africa (CAF). It was hosted by Egypt.

Just like in 1972, the field of eight teams was split into two groups of four. Zaire won its second championship (their first win came as Congo-Kinshasa), tying Zambia 2−2 in the final and beating them 2−0 in the replay. Zaire went on to compete in the World Cup later that year. Both finalists were 2 best teams in African qualification to 1974 World Cup.

Qualified teams

The 8 qualified teams are:

  (holders)
 
  (host)

Squads

Venues

Group stage

Group A

Group B

Knockout stage

Semifinals

Third place match

Final

Replay

Scorers
9 goals
  Ndaye Mulamba

4 goals
  Ali Abo Greisha

3 goals

  Stanley Mubiru
  Mayanga Maku
  Bernard Chanda

2 goals

  Jacques Ndomba
  Ali Khalil
  Simon Kaushi
  Hassan Shehata
  Morciré Sylla
  Kobinan Kouman
  Daniel Imbert

1 goal

  Sebastien Lakou
  Jean-Michel M'Bono
  Noël Minga
  Paul Moukila
  François M'Pelé
  Gamal Abdel Azim
  Hassan El-Shazly
  Moustafa Abdou
  Taha Basry
  Bengally Sylla
  Kakoko Etepé
  Joseph Mapulanga
  Edenté
  Kidumu Mantantu
  Godfrey Chitalu
  Obby Kapita
  Brighton Sinyangwe

Own goal
  Ilunga Mwepu (against Egypt)

CAF Team of the tournament
Goalkeeper
  Kazadi Mwamba

Defenders
  Gabriel Dengaki
  Dick Chama
  Lobilo Boba
  Hany Moustafa

Midfielders
  Ndaye Mulamba
  Farouk Gaafar
  Hassan Shehata
  Mayanga Maku
Forwards
  Kakoko Etepé
  Ali Abo Greisha

References

External links
 Details at RSSSF
 Details at www.angelfire.com
 footballmundial.tripod.com
 www.world-results.net

 
Nations
International association football competitions hosted by Egypt
African Cup Of Nations, 1974
Africa Cup of Nations tournaments
1974 in Egyptian sport
March 1974 sports events in Africa